Machaut is a crater on Mercury. It has a diameter of 106 kilometers. Its name was adopted by the International Astronomical Union in 1976. Machaut is named for the French composer and poet Guillaume de Machaut, who lived from 1300 to 1377.

References

Impact craters on Mercury